Jadeidi-Makr or Makr-Jadeidi is an Arab local council formed by the merger of the two Arab towns of Makr and Jadeidi in 1990. It is located a few kilometers east of the city of Acre in the Northern District, Israel.

History

Crusader kingdom
Arabic documents referring to the hudna (truce agreement) of 1283 between the Crusaders based in Acre and the Mamluk sultan al-Mansur Qalawun are mentioning "Makr Harsin" and "al-Hudeidah", as part of the domain of the Crusaders, where "al-Hudeidah" represents modern Jadeidi. "Makr Harsin" is either the original name of Makr, or, alternatively, it is possible that the text refers to two separate locations, Makr and Harsin, the latter remaining unidentified.

Ottoman Empire
Incorporated into the Ottoman Empire in 1517, Makr appeared in the census of 1596, located in the nahiya (subdistrict) of Acre, part of Safad Sanjak. The population was 22 households and 3 bachelors, all Muslim. They paid taxes on wheat, barley, summer crops, fruit trees, cotton, occasional revenues, goats and beehives; a total of 17,000 akçe. A map by Pierre Jacotin from Napoleon's invasion of 1799 showed both places, named as "Makr" and "Sedid".

In 1875 Victor Guérin visited Makr, and found it to have 350 inhabitants, half Muslim and half "Schismatic Greek". He further noted that "In and about El Mekr are broken columns, the fragment of an ancient bas-relief, a little sarcophagus in terra cotta, and several sepulchral caves." He found Jadeidi to have 350 inhabitants.

In 1881, the PEF's Survey of Western Palestine (SWP) described Jadeidi as "a village, built of stone, containing about eighty Moslems and twenty Christians, surrounded by olives and arable land, situated near the plain, .....with many cisterns for rain water to drink from." Makr was described as "a village, built of stone, containing 100 Moslems and eighty Christians, situated at the edge of the plain, surrounded by olives and arable land; there are many cisterns for rain-water in the village."

A population list from about 1887 showed that Jadeidi had about 245 inhabitants; half Muslim and half Greek Christians, while Makr had 280 inhabitants; one third Catholic and Greek Christians, two thirds Muslim.

British Mandate

In the 1922 census of Palestine conducted by the British Mandate authorities Jadeidi had a population of 204 residents; 108 Muslims and 96 Christians. Of the Christians, 51 were Orthodox and 45 Greek Catholic (Melchite). Al Makr had a population of 281; 206 Muslims and 75 Christians. Of the Christians, 30 were Orthodox and 45 Greek Catholic (Melchite). In the 1931 census, Jadeidi had a population of 249; 146 Muslims and 103 Christians, in a total of 57 houses, while Makr had a population of 331; 257 Muslims and 74 Christians, in a total of 77 houses.

In the 1945 statistics the population of Jadeidi was 280; 150 Muslims and 130 Christians, who owned 5,219 dunams of land according to an official land and population survey. 1,855 dunams were plantations and irrigable land, 2,202 dunams were used for cereals, while 39 dunams were built-up (urban) land.

The same year the population of Makr was 490; 390 Muslims and 100 Christians, while 8,791 dunams of land belonged to the village according to the same official land and population survey. 96 dunams were for citrus and bananas, 730 for plantations and irrigable land, 7,241 used for cereals, while 26 dunams were built-up (urban) land.

Israel
Makr was captured by the Israeli army during the first part of Operation Dekel, 8–14 July 1948, and remained under Martial Law until 1966. Mahmoud Darwish's family, who originated from the destroyed Arab village of al-Birwa, live in the town and Darwish was educated and raised there.

Sports
The town's main football team, Hapoel Bnei Jadeidi F.C., will start the 2011-12 season in the Israeli Liga Gimel (Israeli Fifth Division).

Transportation
Israel Railways has proposed building an additional train station at Jadeidi-Makr on the Railway to Karmiel, although the dates for construction are not set.

Notable people

 Beram Kayal (born 1988), Israeli professional footballer

See also
Arab localities in Israel

References

Bibliography

External links
Welcome To al-Jadeida
Welcome To Makr
Survey of Western Palestine, Map 3: IAA, Wikimedia commons 

Arab localities in Israel
1990 establishments in Israel
Local councils in Northern District (Israel)
Arab Christian communities in Israel